Black Magic is a 1975 Hong Kong horror film directed by Ho Meng Hua and starring Ti Lung, Lo Lieh, Lily Li and Ku Feng. A sequel to the film was released in 1976.

Plot

There is an evil magician named Shan Chien-mi. He lives in a forest and anyone who wants to wreak vengeance on their enemy comes here and asks him to kill their enemy. Then,  Shan Chien-mi will get a great amount of gold from them as payment. At the same time, Master Fu Yong, a kind magician, notices that Shan Chien-mi is doing something immoral so he plans to destroy the evil magician.

Xu Nuo and his fiancée Chu-ying are deeply in love with each other and finally decide to get married. However, on the wedding day, Xu Nuo breaks up with his fiancée unexpectedly and starts a new relationship with a rich widow named Luo Yin.

In fact, Luo Yin has always been attracted to Xu Nuo so she asks Shan Chien-mi to use the Tame Head of Love to make Xu Nuo unconsciously fall in love with her. Luo Yin's goal is attained, but she is still not satisfied. She wants Xu Nuo’s former fiancée to die. Shan Chien-mi uses the Tame Head of Death to make Chu-ying suffer from an incurable disease.

Fortunately, a friend of Chu-ying’s asks Master Fu Yong for help. The magician successfully saves Chu-ying.

Master Fu Yong finds Xu Nuo in the widow's house and breaks the Tame Head of Love. After that, he fights with Shan Chien-mi and finally kills him and the widow.

Cast
Ti Lung as Xu Nuo
Lo Lieh as Liang Chia-chieh
 as Mrs. Zhou / Luo Yin
Lily Li as Wang Chu-ying
Ku Feng as Shan Chien-mi
Ku Wen-chung as Master Fu Yong
Lee Sau-kei as Uncle Feng
Elliot Ngok as Mr. Wang
Chen Ping as Mrs. Wang
Lam Wai-tiu as Wei Te-chin
Lam Fung as Nuo's colleague
Norman Chu as Nuo's colleague
Ng Hong-sang as Nuo's colleague
Helen Ko as Shan's patron #1
Shum Shuk-yee as Mistress cured by Shan's patron #1
Ofelia Yau as Bridesmaid
Lam Siu as Doctor
Koo Chim-hung as Doctor
Chin Chun as Party guest
Fung King-man as Wedding guest
Tam Ying as Wedding guest
Cheung Siu-lun as Party guest

External links
 
 Black Magic at the Hong Kong Movie DataBase

1975 films
1975 horror films
Hong Kong supernatural horror films
1970s Mandarin-language films
Shaw Brothers Studio films
Films directed by Ho Meng Hua
1970s Hong Kong films